Şayeste Hanım ("the best";  1838 – 11 February 1912) was a consort of Sultan Abdulmejid I of the Ottoman Empire.

Early life
Of Abkhazian origin and member of princely family of Inalipa, Şayeste Hanım was born in 1838. She had one sister, Hüsnidil Hanım, who was the wife of a certain Safvet Pasha. She was also related to Kabasalal Çerkes Mehmed Pasha.

Marriage
Şayeste married Abdulmejid in 1851, and was given the title of "Sixth Ikbal". A year after the marriage, on 3 February 1853, she gave birth to her first child, a son, Şehzade Abdüllah, stillborn. 

In 1853, she was elevated to the title of "Fifth Ikbal", in 1854, she was elevated to the title of "Fourth Ikbal", and in 1856, she was elevated to the title of "Third Ikbal". On 30 September 1856, she gave birth to her second child, a daughter, Naile Sultan (called also Nadile Sultan). 

In 1858–59, she commissioned a mosque in Üsküdar. She was known for living beyond her means, and was sued for non-payment of a debt. She was widowed at Abdulmejid's death on 25 June 1861.

Widowhood
After Gülistü Kadın's death in 1861, a newborn Şehzade Mehmed Vahideddin (future Mehmed VI) was entrusted in her care. The prince had a rough time with his overbearing stepmother, and at the age of 16 he left his stepmother's mansion with the three servants who had been serving him since childhood. 

In 1876, She had her daughter, Naile Sultan, married to her relative Kabasakal Çerkeş Mehmed Paşa. Naile died four years later on 7 January 1882 at the age of 25. After Naile's death, Mehmed Pasha married Esma Sultan, the daughter of Sultan Abdulaziz in 1889.

During the reign of Abdul Hamid II, Mehmed was given a mansion in Çengelköy. On this estate, Mehmed had another house built for Şayeste, with whom he had spent his childhood. Even though he had not got along with his stepmother in the past, he could not forget the struggle she had gone through while bringing him up.

In March 1898, Şayeste attended the wedding of Naime Sultan, the daughter of Sultan Abdul Hamid II and Kemaleddin Pasha, the son of Gazi Osman Pasha. Among her ladies-in-waiting was Inşirah Hanım, who would later become a consort her adopted son Mehmed. 

Ayşe Sultan, daughter of Abdul Hamid  II, notes in her memoirs that during her father's reign, Şayeste would attend Ramadan celebrations, and would always sit next to Perestu Kadın.
In 1912 she wrote to the sultan to obtain the money to renovate her rooms at Feriye Palace, but she died before receiving a reply.

Death
Among the longest living consorts of Abdulmejid, Şayeste died on 11 February 1912 in the Çengelköy Palace at the age of about seventy-four outliving her daughter by thirty years. She was buried in the mausoleum of Şehzade Ahmed Kemaleddin in Yahya Efendi Cemetery, Constantinople, today known as Istanbul.

Issue

In literature
Şayeste is a character in Hıfzı Topuz's historical novel Abdülmecit: İmparatorluk Çökerken Sarayda 22 Yıl: Roman (2009).

See also
Ikbal (title)
Ottoman Imperial Harem
List of consorts of the Ottoman sultans

References

Sources

1838 births
1912 deaths
People from the Ottoman Empire of Circassian descent
Ottoman Sunni Muslims
Consorts of Abdulmejid I